Sutahata Assembly constituency was an assembly constituency in Purba Medinipur district in the Indian state of West Bengal.

Overview
As a consequence of the orders of the Delimitation Commission, Sutahata Assembly constituency ceases to exist from 2011.

It was part of Tamluk (Lok Sabha constituency).

Results

2006
In the 2006 elections, Nityananda Bera of CPI(M) defeated his nearest rival Tushar Kanti Mondal of Trinamool Congress.

1977-2006
In 2006 and 2001 state assembly elections, Nityananda Bera of CPI(M) won the 205 Sutahata assembly seat (SC) defeating his nearest rival Tushar Kanti Mondal of Trinamool Congress. Tushar Kanti Mandal of Congress defeated Nityananda Bera of CPI(M) in 1996. Lakshman Chandra Seth of CPI(M) defeated Tushar Mandal of Congress in 1991, Narendra Nath Patra of Congress/ Independent in 1987 and 1982. Shiba Nath Das of Janata Party defeated Lakshman Chandra Seth of CPI(M) in 1977.

1962-1972
Rabindra Nath Karan of CPI won in 1972. Baneswar Patra of Bangla Congress won in 1971. Harahari Deb of Congress won in 1969. M.C.Das of Bangla Congress won in 1967. Mahtab Chand Das of Congress won in 1962.

References

Former assembly constituencies of West Bengal
Politics of Purba Medinipur district